Tessa Shapovalova (born 14 March 1969) is an Israeli-Ukrainian tennis coach and former professional player.

Shapovalova is the mother of pro tennis player Denis Shapovalov.

Shapovalova was born in Lviv, Ukraine, then part of the Soviet Union was on the Soviet national tennis team, and moved from the Soviet Union to Tel Aviv with Denis' father (Viktor Shapovalov) when the Soviet Union was collapsing. She eventually became a tennis coach there. She is Jewish.

Shapovalova has two children, Evgeniy and Denis, born in Israel. The family moved from Israel to Canada before Denis's first birthday. Shapovalova, son Denis Shapovalov worked as a tennis coach for many years.

She got a job as a tennis coach at the Richmond Hill Country Club where Denis Shapovalov started to play. Eventually, Denis couldn't get enough court time and his mother had the courage to leave her job and open her own tennis Academy in Vaughan called Tessa Tennis. Tessa is still coaching at her Academy while Denis lives in the Bahamas. However, Denis’ mother keeps on traveling all over the world with her son even if they have hired former world no.8 Mikhail Youzhny as Shapovalov's coach.

Career finals

Singles Finals (0–1)

Doubles Finals (4–1)

References

External links
 
 

1969 births
Living people
Sportspeople from Lviv
Soviet female tennis players
Ukrainian female tennis players
Jewish tennis players
Israeli people of Ukrainian descent
Israeli people of Ukrainian-Jewish descent
Israeli people of Russian descent
Israeli people of Russian-Jewish descent

es:Tessa Shapovalova#top